Mary Clarke may refer to:
Mary Basset or Mary Clarke (died 1572), English translator
Mary Clarke (letter writer) (died 1705)
Mary Anne Clarke (1776–1852), mistress of Frederick, Duke of York
Mary Elizabeth Mohl née Clarke (1793–1883), British socialite
Mary Frances Clarke (1803–1887), foundress of the Sisters of Charity of the Blessed Virgin Mary
Mary Cowden Clarke (1809–1898), British author
Mary Clarke Nind (1825–1905), philanthropist and worker for social justice
Mary Jane Clarke, (1862–1910), British suffragette
Mary Clarke (dance critic) (1923–2015), British journalist and dance critic
Mary E. Clarke (1924–2011), American military officer
Mother Antonia née Mary Clarke (1926–2013), American Catholic nun and activist
Mary Pat Clarke (born 1941), American politician

See also
Mary Clark (disambiguation)
Victoria Mary Clarke (born 1966), Irish journalist and writer